The Men's team sprint competition at the 2019 World Single Distances Speed Skating Championships was held on 7 February 2019.

Results
The race was started at 16:17.

References

Men's team sprint